Morgan Run is a  long 2nd order tributary to the Youghiogheny River in Fayette County, Pennsylvania.

Variant names
According to the Geographic Names Information System, it has also been known historically as:
Laurel Run

Course
Morgan Run rises about 2.5 miles west of Holland Hill, Pennsylvania, and then flows north-northwest to join the Youghiogheny River at Indian Creek.

Watershed
Morgan Run drains  of area, receives about 48.4 in/year of precipitation, has a wetness index of 341.94, and is about 53% forested.

Natural history
Morgan Run is the location of Middle Morgan Run BDA.  The oak-dominated slopes along Morgan Run provide habitat for an animal species of special concern.

See also
List of rivers of Pennsylvania

References

Tributaries of the Youghiogheny River
Rivers of Pennsylvania
Rivers of Fayette County, Pennsylvania